Biały Dunajec , is a village in southern Poland situated in the Lesser Poland Voivodeship since 1999; it was previously in Nowy Sącz Voivodeship from 1975–1998.

Villages in Tatra County